Carroll County is a county located in the northwestern part of the State of Georgia. As of the 2020 census, its population was 119,148. Its county seat is the city of Carrollton. Carroll County is included in the Atlanta-Sandy Springs-Roswell, GA Metropolitan Statistical Area and is also adjacent to Alabama on its western border.

History 
The lands of Lee, Muscogee, Troup, Coweta, and Carroll counties were ceded by the Creek people in the Treaty of Indian Springs (1825). This was a huge amount of land in Georgia and Alabama, the last remaining portion of the Creeks' territory, and it was ceded by William McIntosh, the chief of the Lower Creek and a member of the National Council. This cession violated the Law, the Code of 1818 that protected communal tribal land. The Creek National Council ordered the execution of McIntosh and other signatories to the treaty for what it considered treason.

McIntosh was killed at his plantation home, at what has been preserved as the McIntosh Reserve. Menawa and a force of 100-150 Law Defenders from Upper Town lands ceded in this treaty carried out the executions of two other men, including Samuel Hawkins, one of McIntosh's sons-in-law. Benjamin Hawkins Jr., another son-in-law, was also named for execution but he escaped, and soon moved to East Texas with his wife and family. Both of the Hawkins brothers were sons of Benjamin Hawkins, the longstanding US Indian Supervisor of the Creek.

The boundaries of Carroll County were created by the Georgia General Assembly on June 9, 1826, but the county was not named until December 14, 1826. It was named for Charles Carroll of Carrollton, at that time the last surviving signer of the U.S. Declaration of Independence, as was Carrollton, the county seat.

When the county was first organized, the legislature designated the county seat as Old Carrollton, Georgia, but in 1830 it was moved to Carrollton.

This county originally extended from the Chattahoochee River to the Alabama state line on the east and on the west, with its northern boundary at the Cherokee Nation, just north of present-day Interstate 20. As population increased, this land was divided into Carroll, Douglas, and Heard counties, and parts of Haralson and Troup counties. The portion that became Douglas County was once Campbell County which no longer exists (it was divided between Douglas and Fulton counties).

Because the county had few slaves compared to counties developed for cotton plantations, it was called the Free State of Carroll during the 1850s. Even before the cession of territory by the Cherokee in the late 1830s, some white settlers lived in the northern part of the county in the area of Villa Rica.

Carroll County was the site of Georgia's first Gold Rush.

For a time Carroll County was the home of Horace King (architect). King helped build Moore's Bridge over the Chattahoochee River at Whitesburg. Moores Bridge was burned by Union soldiers during the Civil War. During the American Civil War, the county provided the Bowdon Volunteers and the Carroll Boys, which were a part of Cobb's Legion.

On August 21, 1995, Atlantic Southeast Airlines Flight 529 crashed in a field near Carrollton, Georgia. Nine of the 29 passengers and crew were killed in the crash.

In February 2008 several tornadoes hit Carroll County, destroying several homes and damaging many more. On May 11, 2008 (Mother's Day) some of the same areas were hit by more tornadoes. The Mother's Day tornadoes destroyed and damaged many homes and businesses.

On September 21, 2009, portions of Carroll County were flooded after eight days of heavy rainfall, resulting in multiple death. The flooding initially closed more than 60 highways and roads, and it destroyed a number of bridges. Early estimates of the damage totaled $22 million.

Geography

The western two-thirds of Carroll County, in a line from Roopville northeast to Villa Rica, is located in the Upper Tallapoosa River sub-basin of the ACT River Basin (Alabama-Coosa-Tallapoosa River Basin), while the eastern third, east of that same line, is located in the Middle Chattahoochee River-Lake Harding sub-basin of the ACF River Basin (Apalachicola-Chattahoochee-Flint River Basin).

Adjacent counties

 Paulding County – north
 Douglas County – east
 Fulton County – east
 Coweta County – southeast
 Heard County – south
 Randolph County, Alabama – southwest (Central Time border)
 Cleburne County, Alabama – west (Central Time border)
 Haralson County – northwest

Transportation

Major roads

  Interstate 20
  U.S. Route 27
  U.S. Route 27 Alternate
 U.S. Route 27 Business
  U.S. Route 78
  State Route 1
  State Route 1 Business
  State Route 5
  State Route 8
  State Route 16
  State Route 61
  State Route 100
  State Route 101
  State Route 113
  State Route 166
 State Route 166 Connector
  State Route 274
  State Route 402 (unsigned designation for I-20)

Pedestrians and cycling

 Carrollton Greenbelt
 UWG Nature Trails

Railroads
The Southern Railway ran several daily passenger trains, including the Kansas City-Florida Special, the Sunnyland and an Atlanta-Birmingham section of the Piedmont Limited, making full stops in Bremen. These trains made flag or signal stops in Villa Rica as well. The last trains made stops in 1967.

Demographics

2000 census
As of the census of 2000, there were 87,268 people, 31,568 households, and 23,013 families living in the county. There were 34,067 housing units at an average density of 68 per square mile (26/km2). The racial makeup of the county was 80.5% White, 16.3% Black or African American, 0.3% Native American, 0.6% Asian, <0.1% Pacific Islander, 1.1% from other races, and 1.1% from two or more races. 2.6% of the population were Hispanic or Latino of any race.

There were 31,568 households, out of which 35.2% had children under the age of 18 living with them, 56.3% were married couples living together, 12.3% had a female householder with no husband present, and 27.1% were non-families. 21.2% of all households were made up of individuals, and 7.6% had someone living alone who was 65 years of age or older. The average household size was 2.66 and the average family size was 3.09.

In the county, the population was spread out, with 25.9% under the age of 18, 12.9% from 18 to 24, 29.9% from 25 to 44, 21.2% from 45 to 64, and 10.0% who were 65 years of age or older. The median age was 32 years. For every 100 females, there were 95.10 males. For every 100 females age 18 and over, there were 91.50 males.

The median income for a household in the county was $38,799, and the median income for a family was $44,642. Males had a median income of $33,102 versus $22,538 for females. The per capita income for the county was $17,656. About 10.0% of families and 13.7% of the population were below the poverty line, including 15.4% of those under age 18 and 16.0% of those age 65 or over.

2010 census
As of the 2010 United States Census, there were 110,527 people, 39,187 households, and 27,923 families living in the county. The racial makeup of the county was 75.6% white, 18.2% black or African American, 0.8% Asian, 0.4% American Indian, 2.8% from other races, and 2.2% from two or more races. Those of Hispanic or Latino origin made up 6.2% of the population. In terms of ancestry, 23.0% were American, 11.2% were Irish, 8.7% were English, and 7.0% were German.

Of the 39,187 households, 37.8% had children under the age of 18 living with them, 51.9% were married couples living together, 14.1% had a female householder with no husband present, 28.7% were non-families, and 21.7% of all households were made up of individuals. The average household size was 2.73 and the average family size was 3.16. The median age was 33.5 years.

The median income for a household in the county was $45,559 and the median income for a family was $53,703. Males had a median income of $42,188 versus $32,043 for females. The per capita income for the county was $20,523. About 12.5% of families and 17.3% of the population were below the poverty line, including 20.3% of those under age 18 and 14.4% of those age 65 or over.

2020 census

As of the 2020 United States Census, there were 119,148 people, 42,798 households, and 30,346 families residing in the county.

Education

Sports

 Georgia Storm FC - National Premier Soccer League - Carrollton - Formed in 2020 and competes in the Southeast Region of the NPSL. Home games are played at University of West Georgia soccer field.

Communities

Cities
 Bowdon
 Carrollton (county seat)
 Mount Zion
 Temple
 Villa Rica

Towns
 Roopville
 Whitesburg

Unincorporated community
 Bowdon Junction

Politics

See also

 National Register of Historic Places listings in Carroll County, Georgia
 1987 Carroll County Cryptosporidiosis outbreak
List of counties in Georgia

References

Further reading
 

 
1826 establishments in Georgia (U.S. state)
Populated places established in 1826
Georgia (U.S. state) counties
Carroll
Counties of Appalachia